Arsissa transvaalica is a species of snout moth in the genus Arsissa. It was described by Boris Balinsky in 1991 and is known from Namibia and South Africa.

References

Moths described in 1991
Phycitini
Insects of Namibia
Moths of Africa